Eugene H. "Bo" Sherman (c. 1906 – June 19, 1964) was an American football and basketball coach. He served as the head football coach at Henderson State Teachers College—now known as Henderson State University—from 1931 to 1934, at Arkansas Agricultural and Mechanical College—now known as the University of Arkansas at Monticello—from 1935 to 1937, and at George Washington University from 1952 to 1959, compiling a career college football coaching record of 56–62–3. Sherman was a native of Dardanelle, Arkansas. He died on June 19, 1964, at the age of 57, at the University of Virginia Hospital in Charlottesville, Virginia.

Head coaching record

College football

References

Year of birth missing
1900s births
1964 deaths
American football fullbacks
American football tackles
Arkansas–Monticello Boll Weevils football coaches
Basketball coaches from Arkansas
The Citadel Bulldogs basketball coaches
The Citadel Bulldogs football coaches
George Washington Colonials football coaches
Henderson State Reddies football coaches
Henderson State Reddies football players
Henderson State Reddies men's basketball coaches
High school football coaches in Arkansas
Houston Cougars football coaches
Oklahoma City Chiefs football coaches
Oklahoma City Stars men's basketball coaches
People from Dardanelle, Arkansas
Players of American football from Arkansas
VMI Keydets football coaches